Dash of Destruction (also known as Doritos Dash of Destruction) is a racing advergame developed by independent software developer NinjaBee for the Xbox 360's Xbox Live Arcade service. It was released on December 17, 2008 for free. The concept originated from gamer Mike Borland, winner of Doritos-sponsored "Unlock Xbox" competition.

The game is regarded as the easiest game to earn all achievements and Gamerscore points out of all XBLA titles released. According to Giant Bomb, the game's twelve achievements can all be easily earned in under 20 minutes. The game references this several times in dialogue with the player, such as telling players to "get their Gamerscore on" and to "go on a Gamerscore rampage". This game is no longer available on the Xbox Live Marketplace, but can be re-downloaded if it was previously downloaded before it was taken off the Xbox Live Marketplace, the full game can also be found physically on Xbox Magazine demo disc #96.

Gameplay
In Dash of Destruction, there are two modes of gameplay, both occurring on the same city maps. In one mode players play as a Doritos delivery truck, racing around town delivering Doritos. This is achieved by driving over Doritos bags. However, the player is doing this while a Tyrannosaurus rex is chasing them, attempting to eat the truck. It is a race to see if the player can make a certain number of deliveries before the T. rex can eat a certain number of trucks. In some levels, there is an additional truck, named the Rogue Delivery Truck, which attempts to steal the player's deliveries.

In the second mode, the player takes the role of the T. rex and must eat a certain number of delivery trucks before the trucks make a certain number of deliveries. In some levels, an additional T. rex is present on the map that attempts to eat the trucks before the player can eat them.

A third mode is also unlocked if the player completes both above game modes. This mode will have the player control a sniper from Call of Duty: Modern Warfare 2, shooting bottles of Mountain Dew in the allotted time. For shooting enough targets, the player earns a code that is redeemable on the Xbox Live Marketplace for fourteen days of double experience on Call of Duty: Modern Warfare 2.

There are different modes in multiplayer, where the players can take the role of the T. rex, the Delivery Truck, or both. Multiplayer is limited to local multiplayer.

See also
 King Games
 Yaris (video game)
 Harms Way
 Doritos Crash Course

References

External links
GameFAQs

2008 video games
Advergames
Freeware games
Frito-Lay
Microsoft games
NinjaBee games
Racing video games
Video games developed in the United States
Xbox 360 Live Arcade games
Xbox 360-only games
Xbox 360 games
Multiplayer and single-player video games
Video games about food and drink